Christian Lomsdalen (born 14 May 1985) is the president of the Norwegian Humanist Association, elected in 2021.

Career

He earned a master's degree in peace and conflict transformation at the University of Tromsø in 2012 and a master's degree in the history of religion at the University of Bergen in 2019. He is a research fellow at same university.

Norwegian Humanist Association
In 2021 he was elected president of the Norwegian Humanist Association, after having served as its vice president from 2019 to 2021.

References

Norwegian humanists
1985 births
Living people